Byrkjelandsvatnet or Storavatnet is a lake in the municipality of Bjerkreim in Rogaland county, Norway. The lake flows out through the short river Malmeisåna which flows into the lake Hofreistæ.

See also
List of lakes in Norway

References

Bjerkreim
Lakes of Rogaland